Gerardo García Berodia (born 6 June 1981) is a Spanish professional footballer who plays as a left winger or a forward for CF Celta Barreiros.

He amassed Segunda División B totals of 235 matches and 60 goals over nine seasons, representing nine clubs. Professionally, he appeared for Lugo and Jorge Wilstermann.

Club career
Born in Madrid, Berodia joined Real Madrid in 1991 at age 10. He left seven years later and, until the age of 31, competed solely in lower league and amateur football, representing CD El Álamo, DAV Santa Ana, RSD Alcalá, CA Pinto, UD San Sebastián de los Reyes, CDA Navalcarnero, CD Leganés, Zamora CF, SD Ponferradina, UB Conquense and CD Lugo; with the latter club, he contributed seven goals in the 2011–12 season to help to promotion to Segunda División after a two-decade absence, also being featured in the playoffs against CD Atlético Baleares and Cádiz CF.

Berodia appeared in his first game as a professional on 15 September 2012, coming on as a 75th-minute substitute in a 2–4 home loss against SD Huesca. In the following transfer window, he moved abroad for the first time in his career and joined several compatriots at Club Jorge Wilstermann from the Liga de Fútbol Profesional Boliviano.

Berodia scored 14 goals in his only full campaign, notably helping his team finish fourth in the Apertura. He returned to Spain shortly after due to family reasons, signing with former side Navalcarnero.

On 10 January 2016, during a Tercera División fixture at CU Collado Villalba, Berodia netted seven times in a final 12–1 rout, as the opposition fielded only youth players in protest against the board of directors.

Personal life
After returning to Spain in the middle of 2014, finding himself unemployed, Berodia bought a taxicab to provide for his family. He continued exercising the profession still as an active player.

References

External links

1981 births
Living people
Spanish footballers
Footballers from Madrid
Association football wingers
Association football forwards
Segunda División players
Segunda División B players
Tercera División players
Divisiones Regionales de Fútbol players
RSD Alcalá players
UD San Sebastián de los Reyes players
CDA Navalcarnero players
CD Leganés players
Zamora CF footballers
SD Ponferradina players
UB Conquense footballers
CD Lugo players
CD Móstoles URJC players
CF Rayo Majadahonda players
Bolivian Primera División players
C.D. Jorge Wilstermann players
Spanish expatriate footballers
Expatriate footballers in Bolivia
Spanish expatriate sportspeople in Bolivia